Kevin Hardy may refer to:

Kevin Hardy (linebacker) (born 1973), former American football linebacker
Kevin Hardy (defensive tackle) (born 1945), former American football defensive tackle